Baddeck is a village in Nova Scotia, Canada.

Baddeck may also refer to:

Baddeck River, Nova Scotia, Canada
Forks Baddeck, Nova Scotia, Nova Scotia, Canada
Baddeck (Crown Jewel) Airport
, one of multiple ships of the same name
Canadian Aerodrome Baddeck No. 1 and No. 2, two early aircraft designs
Baddeck Academy
Baddeck, And That Sort of Thing, novel by Charles Dudley Warner
Baddeck the Buoy Boat, a character from the TV series Theodore Tugboat